The Brazilian Terrier is a breed of dog developed in Brazil. It is one of several terriers and one of the two worldwide recognized native breeds of Brazil.

Description

Origin
One theory about the origin of the breed is that Jack Russell Terriers, Parson Russell Terriers and Fox Terriers were brought to Brazil from Europe in the 1800s and served as the nearest ancestor of the Brazilian Terrier. Another theory is that the breed is derived from Spanish breeds such as the Ratonero Bodeguero Andaluz and Ratonero Valenciano brought to Brazil in vessels during the period of the Iberian Union.

Appearance
This terrier stands between 13–16 in (35.5-40.5 cm) at the withers. The breed generally weighs between 15-22 lbs (7–10 kg). Its coat is short, sleek, and fine. The coloring is always tri-color (white, tan and black or white, tan and blue or white, tan and brown). A docked tail, narrow chest, flat triangular skull and a well balanced body are the most common characteristics. The ears are half-pricked and folded, with the tip falling down.

Temperament
The temperament of this breed is very similar to a Jack Russell Terrier, very alert, perky and intelligent. Very friendly, loves to play and dig holes. Spirited and obedient but fearless, as watchdogs they will only bark to get your attention and then leave the rest up to you. This breed needs fair and consistent training, otherwise, they can become destructive. Their hunting instinct is the strongest among average terriers and should not be trusted with other small animals.

Living conditions and exercise
Small apartments or spaces are not good for this breed of dog, because they are very active; an average-size yard is highly recommended. It also needs both physical and mental activities to be happy. A common tendency is for it to become destructive and restless if kept indoors; therefore, long daily walks are the best option.

See also
 Dogs portal
 List of dog breeds
Japanese Terrier
Fila Brasileiro
Campeiro Bulldog
Ratonero Bodeguero Andaluz

References

External links

FCI - Brazilian Terrier breed standard

FCI breeds
Terriers
Dog breeds originating in Brazil
Rare dog breeds